Ancylis rhenana is a moth belonging to the family Tortricidae. The species was first described by Johann Müller-Rutz in 1920.

It is native to Europe.

References

Enarmoniini